Dene Grigar is a digital artist and scholar based in Vancouver, Washington. She was the  President of the Electronic Literature Organization from 2013 to 2019. In 2016, Grigar received the International Digital Media and Arts Association's Lifetime Achievement Award.

Early Life and Career 
Dene Grigar married John Barber. Her mother is from what was then Czechoslovakia.

Scholarship 
Grigar is Professor and Director of the Creative Media & Digital Culture Program at Washington State University Vancouver. Her scholarship is largely focused on electronic literature, and has appeared in journals like Computers and Composition and Technoculture. She co-authored Traversals: The Use of Preservation for Early Electronic Writing (MIT Press 2017) with Stuart Moulthrop. The book was a product of a 2013 National Endowment for the Humanities (NEH) Startup Grant. Grigar's scholarly interests can be traced back to the early 1990s, when she took a class with Nancy Kaplan.

Grigar has done extensive work curating exhibitions of digital art and electronic literature, including for the Library of Congress and Modern Language Association. Grigar helped lead the ELO repository in 2018, which was funded in part by a grant from the Andrew W. Mellon Foundation. Grigar is now curating and editing the NeXt, an online digital museum and library, which presents preserved and emulated works of digital art and writing.

Grigar was a member of the Kairos editorial board.

Works
Grigar co edited a volume of essays, Electronic Literature as Digital Humanities: Contexts, Forms, and Practices. This work collates essays on the state of electronic literature in 2021.

Essays
Grigar's essays mainly concern pedagogy and archiving aspects of electronic literature. 
 Defending your life in MOOspace: A report from the electronic edge, 1997 with John Barbar (presented at the Thirteenth Computers and Writing Conference, 1997)
 Over the line, online, gender lines: Email and women in the classroom, 1999.
 On Chance and Change and the Paths on Which They Take Us, 2006
 he Jungfrau Tapes: A Conversation with Diana Slattery about The Glide Project, both published by the Iowa Review Web
 Electronic literature: Where Is It?, 2008.
 Curating Electronic Literature as Critical and Scholarly Practice, 2014
 Born digital preservation of e-lit: a live internet traversal of Sarah Smith's King of Space, 2019
 The computer is not a tool to help us do whatever we do, it is what we do, it is the medium on which we work: Dene Grigar in conversation with Piotr Marecki, 2019
 Challenges to Archiving and Documenting Born-Digital Literature: What Scholars, Archivists, and Librarians Need to Know, 2021 (Grigar's chapter in Electronic Literature as Digital Humanities: Contexts, Forms, and Practices.)

Electronic Literature and Artworks 
Grigar has produced a number of multimodal artworks, including:
Fallow Fields: A Story in Two Parts (2004) was published in The Iowa Review Web,
When Ghosts Will Die, a finalist in the 2006 Drunken Boat Panliterary Awards.
24-Hr. Micro-Elit Project centers on a collection of 24 stories about life in an American city in the 21st Century and involves 140 characters or less delivered—that is, "tweeted"—on Twitter over a 24 hr. period. Launched on Friday, August 21, 2009.
 Fort Vancouver Mobile project was funded by the NEH. This was a locative / mixed media effort that brings together a core team of 23 scholars, digital storytellers, new media producers, historians, and archaeologists to create location-aware nonfiction content for mobile phones to be used at the Fort Vancouver National Historic Site.
 Curlew, which was featured at the 2014 OLE.1 festival in Naples,

Books 
Traversals: A method of preservation for born-digital texts, with Stuart Moulthrop, 2017 (includes The Many Faces of Judy Malloy's Uncle Roger)

See also 

 Electronic Literature Organization
 List of electronic literature authors, critics, and works
 Digital poetry
 E-book#History
 Electronic literature
 Hypertext fiction
 Interactive fiction
 Literatronica

References 

Electronic literature writers
Living people
Washington State University faculty
Artists from Washington (state)
American multimedia artists
Year of birth missing (living people)
21st-century American women artists